Dupont is a town in Lancaster Township, Jefferson County, Indiana, United States. The population was 339 at the 2010 census.

History
Dupont was founded in 1849. It was named after the Du Pont family.

Dupont was one of the towns visited by John Hunt Morgan on his raid.

Geography
Dupont is located at  (38.890569, -85.516463).

Demographics

2010 census
As of the census of 2010, there were 339 people, 117 households, and 87 families living in the town. The racial makeup of the town was 95.9% White, 2.1% African American, and 2.1% from other races. Hispanic or Latino of any race were 2.7% of the population.

There were 117 households, of which 45.3% had children under the age of 18 living with them, 50.4% were married couples living together, 14.5% had a female householder with no husband present, 9.4% had a male householder with no wife present, and 25.6% were non-families. 23.1% of all households were made up of individuals, and 8.6% had someone living alone who was 65 years of age or older. The average household size was 2.90 and the average family size was 3.26.

The median age in the town was 33.9 years. 31.6% of residents were under the age of 18; 9% were between the ages of 18 and 24; 23.6% were from 25 to 44; 25.6% were from 45 to 64; and 10% were 65 years of age or older. The gender makeup of the town was 51.9% male and 48.1% female.

2000 census
As of the census of 2000, there were 392 people, 139 households, and 97 families living in the town. The racial makeup of the town was 95.92% White, 1.53% African American, 0.26% Native American, 1.02% Asian, 0.51% from other races, and 0.77% from two or more races. Hispanic or Latino of any race were 2.30% of the population.

There were 139 households, out of which 44.6% had children under the age of 18 living with them, 49.6% were married couples living together, 14.4% had a female householder with no husband present, and 29.5% were non-families. 22.3% of all households were made up of individuals, and 10.8% had someone living alone who was 65 years of age or older. The average household size was 2.76 and the average family size was 3.23.

In the town, the population was spread out, with 33.9% under the age of 18, 8.2% from 18 to 24, 31.4% from 25 to 44, 16.6% from 45 to 64, and 9.9% who were 65 years of age or older. The median age was 31 years. For every 100 females, there were 94.1 males. For every 100 females age 18 and over, there were 89.1 males.

The median income for a household in the town was $37,188, and the median income for a family was $32,083. Males had a median income of $32,188 versus $23,333 for females. The per capita income for the town was $13,966. About 16.8% of families and 19.3% of the population were below the poverty line, including 25.7% of those under age 18 and none of those age 65 or over.

References

Towns in Jefferson County, Indiana
Towns in Indiana
Populated places established in 1849
1849 establishments in Indiana